The men's 3000 metres event at the 2015 European Athletics Indoor Championships was held on 6 March at 18:00 (heats) and on 7 March at 19:45 (final) local time.

Medalists

Results

Heats
Qualification: First 4 of each heat (Q) and the next 4 fastest (q) qualified for the final.

Final

References

2015 European Athletics Indoor Championships
3000 metres at the European Athletics Indoor Championships